A Luneta Mágica is a 1869 novel written by Brazilian Romantic writer Joaquim Manuel de Macedo. It is considered to be one of the first Brazilian fantastic novels ever, comparable to the works of E. T. A. Hoffmann.

Plot
The book tells the story of Simplício, a naïve and near-sighted man who lives with his brother Américo, an ascending politician, his cousin Anica and extremely religious aunt Domingas, and wishes to be able of seeing again one day. A friend of his, old man Nunes, takes him to Reis, an optometrist who is able to make very powerful lenses; however, none of them are able to make Simplício see again. Reis then suggests Simplício to go see a friend of his, an unnamed Armenian magician who makes magical lenses.

Simplício is finally able to see again, but the Armenian tells him that if he looks to someone or something for more than three minutes, he would see the evil enclosed on them. However, Simplício does not pay attention to the Armenian's warning, and starts seeing the evil parts of all things, and considered to be crazy, becomes a recluse.

Simplício accidentally destroys the "evil" lenses one day, and returns to see the Armenian – this time he gives to Simplício new lenses that make him see the good parts of all things. Being seduced and manipulated by everyone he knows, after many mishaps Simplício finally obtains the "sanity" lenses, and is able to live happily again.

1869 novels
Brazilian fantasy novels
Portuguese-language novels